Jan Didriksen (15 May 1917 – 14 December 1996) was a Norwegian jurist and businessperson.

He was born in Sarpsborg. During World War II he was a local Milorg leader and was arrested in July 1942, and incarcerated at Grini and later in Sachsenhausen.

He served as Chief executive of the Federation of Norwegian Industries from 1965 to 1982. In 1987 he published the book Industrien under hakekorset, on the role of the Norwegian industry during the occupation of Norway by Nazi Germany.

References

1917 births
1996 deaths
People from Sarpsborg
20th-century Norwegian businesspeople
Norwegian resistance members
Grini concentration camp survivors
Sachsenhausen concentration camp survivors